Mikhaylovka 2-ya is a selo in Dmitriyevskoye Rural Settlement, Paninsky District, Voronezh Oblast, Russia. The population is 162 as of 2010. There are five streets.

Geography 
Mikhaylovka 2-ya is located on the Rtishchevo River, 26 km northwest of Panino (the district's administrative centre) by road. Nikolskoye 1-ye is the nearest rural locality.

References 

Rural localities in Paninsky District